is a town located in Motosu District, Gifu Prefecture, Japan. , the town had an estimated population of 18,410  and a population density of 3600 persons per km2, in 7,449 households. It is the smallest town in Gifu Prefecture in terms of area.

Geography
Kitagata is located in the Nōbi Plain in southern Gifu Prefecture.  The town has a climate characterized by characterized by hot and humid summers, and mild winters  (Köppen climate classification Cfa).  The average annual temperature in Kitagata is 15.3 °C. The average annual rainfall is 1990 mm with September as the wettest month. The temperatures are highest on average in August, at around 27.9 °C, and lowest in January, at around 3.9 °C.

Neighbouring municipalities
Gifu Prefecture
Gifu
Motosu
Mizuho

Demographics
Per Japanese census data, the population of Kitagata has recently plateaued after decades of strong growth.

History
The area around Kitagawa was part of traditional Mino Province. During the Edo period, it was part of the holdings of Kanō Domain, under by the Tokugawa shogunate.  During the post-Meiji restoration cadastral reforms, the area was organised into Motosu District, Gifu Prefecture. The town of Kitagata was formed in 1889 with the establishment of the modern municipalities system. The town was severely damaged by the 1891 Mino–Owari earthquake, which destroyed 602 homes and killed 62 inhabitants.

Education
Kitagata has three public elementary schools and one public middle school operated by the town government. The town has one public high school operated by the Gifu Prefectural Board of Education.

Transportation

Railway 
Kitagata does not have any passenger railway service.

Highway

References

External links

Kitagata official website 

 
Towns in Gifu Prefecture